Genu, a Latin word for "knee," may refer to:

 Genu of internal capsule
 Genu of the corpus callosum
 Genu recurvatum
 Genu valgum
 Genu varum
 Genu, Iran (disambiguation), places in Iran